Plymouth is an unincorporated area in Orange County, Florida, United States, northwest of downtown Apopka along US 441 (SR 500) (Orange Blossom Trail), at the intersection with Plymouth-Sorrento Road. It features the Pinsly Railroad Company's Florida headquarters and part of the Florida Central Railroad. It is statistically part of the Greater Orlando area.

Notable person
Warren Sapp, professional football player, Tampa Bay Buccaneers and Oakland Raiders.

References

Unincorporated communities in Orange County, Florida
Greater Orlando
Unincorporated communities in Florida